Edward Cogswell (February 25, 1854 in England – July 27, 1888 in Fitchburg, Massachusetts) was an English born first baseman in Major League Baseball in the 19th century.

Sources

1854 births
1888 deaths
Major League Baseball first basemen
Major League Baseball players from the United Kingdom
Major League Baseball players from England
English baseball players
Boston Red Caps players
Troy Trojans players
Worcester Ruby Legs players
19th-century baseball players
Manchester (minor league baseball) players